Dennis Miller Wilson (16 February 1920 – 15 July 1989) was a British pianist, composer, arranger and conductor born 16 February 1920 in Leicester.

Biography
During his schooldays in his native town of Leicester, Wilson played the piano for the school orchestra before he was sixteen years old. After leaving school, he played in local bands and when the Army claimed him in 1939, he was eventually posted to India where until 1946, he directed the music at one of the garrison theatres.  
 
His next move was to join Harry Parry's Sextet for three years, after which he featured in several of the popular bands of the period, including those of Harry Hayes and Kenny Baker. From 1949 he was free-lance with recording, radio and television orchestras and has also had much to do with film music.  
 
Wilson was, with George Melachrino, Malcolm Lockyer, Peter Yorke and other well-known orchestra leaders, as well as having his own set-up for some popular radio series, such as “ Educating Archie" and "Pertwee's Progress". He later joined the B.B.C. Show Band and in addition played for commercial T.V. He was an outstandingly good pianist and made numerous recordings playing in combos as trio, quartet, quintet, octet and with his own orchestra.

Wilson was married in 1950, lived at Beckenham, Kent and had two children - Nicholas and Penelope. His principal hobbies were sailing and gardening. He died 15 July 1989 in Cambridge.

Wilson composed the theme music for a number of television series and sitcoms:-

Marriage Lines (1961)
Steptoe and Son (1962) (music for some episodes, but not the theme music)  
Meet the Wife (1963) 
Till Death Us Do Part (1965) 
 Birds on the Wing (1971)
My Wife Next Door (1972) 
Rising Damp (1974) 
 My Honourable Mrs (1975)
Fawlty Towers (1975 - 1979)

References

External links
 
Dennis Wilson on BBC Music
Fawlty Towers sheet music   
Fawlty Towers, names of cast and team

1920 births
1989 deaths
British television composers
People from Leicester
Musicians from Leicestershire
20th-century classical musicians
20th-century English composers